Fumiya Araki (Japanese 荒木 郁也; born 25 April 1988) is a Japanese professional baseball infielder who currently plays for the Hanshin Tigers of Nippon Professional Baseball.

References

External links
, NPB

1988 births
Canberra Cavalry players
Hanshin Tigers players
Living people
Meiji University alumni
Baseball people from Tokyo
Nippon Professional Baseball infielders
Japanese expatriate baseball players in Australia